The Adriatic was a three-masted, two deck, packet ship built in 1861 by Curtis & Tilden, Boston, Massachusetts, United States. On August 12, 1864, the Adriatic was embarked from London, England en route to New York City carrying 163 German immigrants and 100 US citizens. She made it as far as the New Jersey coast before meeting the Confederate raider , that collided with her. Captain John Taylor Wood of Tallahassee ordered every passenger on the Adriatic to be taken prisoner and put on the Tallahassee. Wood then ordered the Adriatic to be burned.

Construction
The Curtis & Tilden shipyard at Boston, Massachusetts built the Adriatic in 1861. The firm E. E. Morgan & Son, were owners of a line of packet ships that ran carried passengers and freight between London and New York, and Adriatic joined their line. Elisha E. Morgan was part-owner, along with Captain Richard H. Moore.

The Adriatic was registered with the ‘’Record of American and Foreign Shipping’’, from 1862 to 1864. Her master was R. H. Moore; her owners were E. E. Morgan; built in 1861 at Curtis & Tilden East Boston; and her hailing port was the Port of New York.

American Civil War

On July 7, 1864, during the American Civil War, Adriatic, Captain Richard H. Moore, sailed from London, England to New York City with 163 German immigrants, 100 US citizens, and 100-tons of coal. On August 12, 1864, she had made the New Jersey coast, 35 miles off Montauk, New York, when she met the Tallahassee, which collided with Adriatic. Captain Wood ordered every one on the Adriatic to be put on the Tallahassee. Wood then ordered the Adriatic to be burned.

In the book, "From Sandy Hook to 62", Charles Edward Russell, describes Tallahassees  chase of Adriatic. When Tallahassee ran down the Adriatic, the Tallahassee lost her mainmast and stanchions.

The next day, Captain Wood captured the bark Suliote, of Belfast, Maine. He transferred the passengers from the pilot boat William Bell, No. 24 and Adriatic to the Suliote. James Callahan was ordered to pilot the Suliote into Sandy Hook, New York.

Alabama Claims

On February 23, 1883, William D. Morgan, executor for Elisha E. Morgan, part-owner of the Adriatic, successfully petitioned the United States District Court for the Southern District of New York via the Alabama Claims award, for compensation of the loss of Adriatic during the Civil War. The case was called William D. Morgan v. The United States (No. 1058). The total claim was for $109,615.95.

On February 10, 1883, James Callahan was deposed for the Alabama Claims award. In his deposition Callahan said that he was captain of the William Bell. The court then asked him to recount the capture of Adriatic by the CSS Tallahassee.

References

External links
 General Information on the Adriatic
 Details of the SV Adriatic

Ships of the United States
1861 ships
Ships built in Boston
Maritime incidents in August 1864